Carl A. Nett (born December 2, 1941) was an American politician in the state of Kentucky. He served in the Kentucky House of Representatives as a Democrat from 1970 to 1990.

References

1941 births
Living people
Democratic Party members of the Kentucky House of Representatives
Politicians from Louisville, Kentucky